Sultan Mohammad Khan (1795 – 1861), also known as Ghazi Sardar Sultan Mohammad Talaei, was an Afghan aristocrat, chief minister and regent. He was a powerful brother of Emir Dost Mohammad Khan, the eventual ruler of Afghanistan who seized control of the country from him. Prior to and during the reign of Dost Mohammad Khan, Sultan Muhammad Khan Telai was chief minister and governor of various regions of Afghanistan, including Kabul, Peshawar and Kohat. He was the first of the Musahiban, a Mohammadzai dynasty that began with him and ruled Afghanistan for more than 150 years, in various forms such as emir, king or president from 1823 to 1978. 

An ethnic Pashtun, Mohammad Khan Talaei was the 15th son of Sardar Payendah Khan (chief of the Barakzai tribe), who was killed in 1799 by Zaman Shah Durrani. Sultan Muhammad Khan's grandfather was Hajji Jamal Khan. 

Sultan Mohammad Khan's wealth, along with his immense love for fine goods like luxurious robes, led to his family giving him his nickname "Telai", meaning golden.

Early history and background 
Sultan Mohammad Khan was born in 1795 to an influential family in Kandahar, Durrani Empire (present-day Kandahar, Afghanistan). His father, Payinda Khan, was chief of the Barakzai tribe and an aristocrat with the title "Sarfraz Khan" in the Durrani dynasty. Their family can be traced back to Abdal (the first and founder of the Abdali tribe) through Hajji Jamal Khan, Yousef, Yaru, Mohammad, Omar Khan, Khisar Khan, Ismail, Nek, Daru, Saifal, and Barak. Abdal had four sons, Popal, Barak, Achak, and Alako.

Political power and death 
Sultan Muhammad Khan assumed rule of Kabul in 1824 from Yar Mohammad Khan Barakzai and held it until 1826 when he was expelled by Dost Mohammad Khan. After their rapprochement, he governed over Peshawar from 1826-1828 and Kohat from 1828-1834. He and the Muhammadzai leaders in general were known for having a great number of wives in order to unify the Afghan tribes and ethnic groups. He died in 1861, and his mausoleum rests on Maranjan Hill in Kabul, Afghanistan.

Notable descendants
H.M. Nadir Shah, King of Afghanistan, great grandson of Emir Sultan Mohammed Khan Telai through his father Colonel H.R.H. Prince Yousuf Khan

H.M. Zahir Shah, King of Afghanistan, son of King Nader Shah

H.R.H. Prince Daoud Khan, Prime minister and first President of Afghanistan

H.R.H. Prince Abdul Aziz Khan Telai, General, Governor of Badakhshan and Kandahar

H.R.H. Prince Abdul Qayyum Khan, Governor of Hazarajat, Governor of various Central Afghan Provicnes; oldest son of Prince Abdul Aziz Khan and father of HRH Prof. Prince Abdul Khalek Khan Telai

H.R.H. Prince Amir Muhammad Khan Telai, General, sided with the British during the third Anglo Afghan War proclaimed himself as Emir in a failed coup d´état against Amanullah Khan; military alliance with Muhammad Ali Jinnah and the All India Muslim League; son of Prince Abdul Aziz Khan

H.R.H. Prince Assadullah "Sharza" Telai, General in the US Air Force; son of HRH Prince Amir Muhammad Khan Telai

H.R.H. Brigade General Prince Abdul Ghaffar Khan Telai, Commander of the Royal Brigade of his cousin HM King Nadir Shah; Carried out the executions of the Amanist Charkhi family, who successfully managed to assassinate HM King Nadir Shah through a Hazara ally; son of HRH Prince Abdul Aziz Khan Telai

H.R.H. Prof. Dr. Prince Abdul Khalek Khan Telai, Afghanistan´s first Physics Professor, Afghan Ambassador to the UN, Chief of Staff of his relative Daoud Khan, son of HRH Prince Abdul Qayyum Khan Telai

H.R.H. Sayyid Sultan Masood Dakik, Diplomat, Political Advisor, European Champion in Judo 1980s, Philanthropist, Order of Merit of Germany, son of Prince Abdul Khalek and his wife Princess Sayyida Rahima Begum from the saintly Hazrat Ishaan family, Hotaki Dynasty and Mughal Imperial Dynasty

H.R.H. Prince Sayyid Raphael Dakik, Leader of ARGE, International Lawyer, Professional Lobbyist, Sufi Grandmaster, oldest son of HRH Prince Sultan Masood Dakik and his wife HRH Sayyida Nargis Begum, niece of HRH Sayyida Rahima Begum

See also
List of heads of state of Afghanistan
Sultan Masood Dakik

References

1795 births
1861 deaths
Emirs of Afghanistan
Pashtun people